Al Lee (born June 8, 1893) was a Boston-born American actor, producer and manager in vaudeville and silent films.

Lee married actress Lilyan Tashman in 1914, but the couple divorced in 1921. Tashman met Lee while working on a double act with Eddie Cantor. Lee later went on to become a manager for George White's Scandals.

Manager/producer
 The Glass Menagerie (Company Manager; March 31, 1945 - August 3, 1946)
 George White's Music Hall Varieties (General Manager; 1933)
 George White's Music Hall Varieties 1932 (General Manager; November 22, 1932 - December 31, 1932)

References

External links
Classic Images article on Lilyan Tashman
George White's 1935 Scandals, with Jed Prouty in the role of Al Lee

Year of birth unknown
Year of death unknown
American male musical theatre actors
American male silent film actors
American theatre managers and producers
Male actors from Boston
Vaudeville performers
20th-century American male actors
1893 births